Pigeon Lake 138A is an Indian reserve in Alberta. It is shared between the Samson Cree Nation, the Montana Cree Nation, the Louis Bull Tribe, and the Ermineskin Cree Nation.

Education
Mimiw Sakahikan school 
Wetaskiwin Regional Division No. 11  operates public schools serving the reserve: Falun Elementary School serves primary grades, and Pigeon Lake Regional School serves secondary grades.

References 

Indian reserves in Alberta
Cree